The X Show is a magazine, variety, and interview/talk program that aired on FX Network in the US from May 1999 to April 2001.  Running time was originally one hour, but this was later reduced to a half-hour.  The show was 'guy-themed' much like a TV equivalent of Maxim magazine (e.g., co-host Daphne Brogdon would conduct hot tub interviews.)  The X Show had numerous hosts and co-hosts, both male and female and would frequently feature spokesmodels.  Ava Cadell was featured in segments providing sexual information and Chris Gore would host segments about movies.

External links
 
 The X Show review at Entertainment Weekly by Ken Tucker

FX Networks original programming
1999 American television series debuts
2001 American television series endings